Cnemaspis rudhira, the scarlet dwarf gecko, is a species of diurnal, rock-dwelling, insectivorous gecko endemic to  India.

References

 Cnemaspis rudhira

rudhira
Reptiles of India
Reptiles described in 2022
Taxa named by Ishan Agarwal
Taxa named by Akshay Khandekar